This is a list of the mammal species recorded in Haiti. Of the mammal species in Haiti, one is critically endangered, one is endangered, two are vulnerable, and eleven are considered to be extinct.

The following tags are used to highlight each species' conservation status as assessed by the International Union for Conservation of Nature:

Order: Sirenia (manatees and dugongs) 

Sirenia is an order of fully aquatic, herbivorous mammals that inhabit rivers, estuaries, coastal marine waters, swamps, and marine wetlands. All four species are endangered.

Family: Trichechidae
Genus: Trichechus
 West Indian manatee, T. manatus  presence uncertain

Order: Rodentia (rodents) 

Rodents make up the largest order of mammals, with over 40% of mammalian species. They have two incisors in the upper and lower jaw which grow continually and must be kept short by gnawing.

Suborder: Hystricognathi
Family: Capromyidae
Tribe: Plagiodontini
Genus: Hyperplagiodontia
 Wide-toothed hutia, H. araeum 
Genus: Plagiodontia
 Hispaniolan hutia, Plagiodontia aedium 
 Samaná hutia, Plagiodontia ipnaeum 
 Small Haitian hutia, Plagiodontia spelaeum 
Genus: Rhizoplagiodontia
 Lemke's hutia, Rhizoplagiodontia lemkei 
Subfamily: Isolobodontinae
Genus: Isolobodon
 Montane hutia, Isolobodon montanus 
 Puerto Rican hutia, Isolobodon portoricensis 
Subfamily: Hexolobodontinae
Genus: Hexolobodon
 Imposter hutia, Hexolobodon phenax 
Family: Heptaxodontidae
Subfamily: Heptaxodontinae
Genus: Quemisia
 Twisted-toothed mouse, Quemisia gravis

Order: Eulipotyphla (shrews, hedgehogs, moles, and solenodons) 

Eulipotyphlans are insectivorous mammals. Shrews and solenodons closely resemble mice, hedgehogs carry spines, while moles are stout-bodied burrowers.

Family: Nesophontidae
Genus: Nesophontes
 Atalaye nesophontes, Nesophontes hypomicrus 
 Western Cuban nesophontes, Nesophontes micrus 
 St. Michel nesophontes, Nesophontes paramicrus 
 Haitian nesophontes, Nesophontes zamicrus 
Family: Solenodontidae
Genus: Solenodon
 Marcano's solenodon, S. marcanoi 
 Hispaniolan solenodon, S. paradoxus

Order: Chiroptera (bats) 

The bats' most distinguishing feature is that their forelimbs are developed as wings, making them the only mammals capable of flight. Bat species account for about 20% of all mammals.

Family: Noctilionidae
Genus: Noctilio
 Greater bulldog bat, Noctilio leporinus 
Family: Vespertilionidae
Subfamily: Vespertilioninae
Genus: Lasiurus
 Minor red bat, Lasiurus minor 
Family: Molossidae
Genus: Molossus
 Velvety free-tailed bat, Molossus molossus 
Genus: Nyctinomops
 Big free-tailed bat, Nyctinomops macrotis 
Genus: Tadarida
 Mexican free-tailed bat, Tadarida brasiliensis 
Family: Mormoopidae
Genus: Mormoops
 Antillean ghost-faced bat, Mormoops blainvillii 
Genus: Pteronotus
 Parnell's mustached bat, Pteronotus parnellii 
 Sooty mustached bat, Pteronotus quadridens 
Family: Phyllostomidae
Subfamily: Phyllostominae
Genus: Macrotus
 Waterhouse's leaf-nosed bat, Macrotus waterhousii 
Subfamily: Brachyphyllinae
Genus: Brachyphylla
 Cuban fruit-eating bat, Brachyphylla nana 
Subfamily: Phyllonycterinae
Genus: Phyllonycteris
 Cuban flower bat, Phyllonycteris poeyi 
Subfamily: Glossophaginae
Genus: Monophyllus
 Leach's single leaf bat, Monophyllus redmani 
Subfamily: Stenodermatinae
Genus: Artibeus
 Jamaican fruit bat, Artibeus jamaicensis 
Genus: Phyllops
 Cuban fig-eating bat, Phyllops falcatus 
Family: Natalidae
Genus: Chilonatalus
 Cuban funnel-eared bat, Chilonatalus micropus

Order: Cetacea (whales) 

The order Cetacea includes whales, dolphins and porpoises. They are the mammals most fully adapted to aquatic life with a spindle-shaped nearly hairless body, protected by a thick layer of blubber, and forelimbs and tail modified to provide propulsion underwater.

Suborder: Mysticeti
Family: Balaenopteridae (baleen whales)
Genus: Balaenoptera 
 Common minke whale, Balaenoptera acutorostrata 
 Sei whale, Balaenoptera borealis 
 Bryde's whale, Balaenoptera brydei 
 Blue whale, Balaenoptera musculus 
Genus: Megaptera
 Humpback whale, Megaptera novaeangliae 
Suborder: Odontoceti
Superfamily: Platanistoidea
Family: Delphinidae (marine dolphins)
Genus: Delphinus
 Short-beaked common dolphin, Delphinus delphis 
Genus: Feresa
 Pygmy killer whale, Feresa attenuata 
Genus: Globicephala
 Short-finned pilot whale, Globicephala macrorhyncus 
Genus: Lagenodelphis
 Fraser's dolphin, Lagenodelphis hosei 
Genus: Grampus
 Risso's dolphin, Grampus griseus 
Genus: Orcinus
 Killer whale, Orcinus orca 
Genus: Peponocephala
 Melon-headed whale, Peponocephala electra 
Genus: Pseudorca
 False killer whale, Pseudorca crassidens 
Genus: Stenella
 Pantropical spotted dolphin, Stenella attenuata 
 Clymene dolphin, Stenella clymene 
 Striped dolphin, Stenella coeruleoalba 
 Atlantic spotted dolphin, Stenella frontalis 
 Spinner dolphin, Stenella longirostris 
Genus: Steno
 Rough-toothed dolphin, Steno bredanensis 
Genus: Tursiops
 Common bottlenose dolphin, Tursiops truncatus 
Family: Physeteridae (sperm whales)
Genus: Physeter
 Sperm whale, Physeter macrocaphalus 
Family: Kogiidae (dwarf sperm whales)
Genus: Kogia
 Pygmy sperm whale, Kogia breviceps 
 Dwarf sperm whale, Kogia sima 
Superfamily Ziphioidea
Family: Ziphidae (beaked whales)
Genus: Mesoplodon
 Gervais' beaked whale, Mesoplodon europaeus 
 Blainville's beaked whale, Mesplodon densirostris 
Genus: Ziphius
 Cuvier's beaked whale, Ziphius cavirostris

Order: Carnivora (carnivorans) 

There are over 260 species of carnivorans, the majority of which feed primarily on meat. They have a characteristic skull shape and dentition.

Suborder: Pinnipedia
Family: Phocidae (earless seals)
Genus: Neomonachus
 Caribbean monk seal, N. tropicalis

Order: Artiodactyla (even-toed ungulates) 
The even-toed ungulates are ungulates – hoofed animals – which bear weight equally on two (an even number) of their five toes: the third and fourth. The other three toes are either present, absent, vestigial, or pointing posteriorly.
Family Suidae (pigs)
Genus: Sus
Wild boar, S. scrofa  introduced

Notes

References

See also
List of chordate orders
Lists of mammals by region
List of prehistoric mammals
Mammal classification
List of mammals described in the 2000s

Haiti
Mammals

Haiti